SS (RMS) Mona's Queen (I) No. 21930 – the first vessel in the Company's history to bear the name – was an iron paddle-steamer which was owned and operated by the Isle of Man Steam Packet Company.

Construction and dimensions
Mona's Queen was built and engined by J. & G. Thomson of Govan, Glasgow and launched in 1852. She had a registered tonnage of 600 tons; length 186'; beam 27' and depth 13'.

Mona's Queen carried a figurehead of Queen Victoria, and was the first vessel to break away from the Company's long association with Robert Napier & Co. The vessel's cost is not recorded, but a reference in the Company's old minute book suggests it was under £14,000. In 1855 she was lengthened (details not recorded) at a cost of £2,111.

Service life

Mona's Queen appears to have had a pretty uneventful career, with the exception of a collision with the steamer Sligo, which occurred in the River Mersey in January 1862. The official inquiry went against the Steam Packet Company who had to pay approximately £300 in damages and costs. The Captain was accordingly reduced from Second Class Master to Third, and his pay was cut from £275 to £250.

Disposal
After ten years service the directors decided to sell the ship and offered it to Cunard, Wilson and Co. for £20,000.

The offer was declined, and negotiations started with a Whitehaven company for a sale at £14,000.

Midway through 1864 the directors admitted they could not sell the vessel. Mona's Queen therefore continued in the Company's service until she was broken up in 1880.

References

Bibliography

 Chappell, Connery (1980). Island Lifeline T.Stephenson & Sons Ltd 

Ships of the Isle of Man Steam Packet Company
1852 ships
Ferries of the Isle of Man
Steamships
Steamships of the United Kingdom
Paddle steamers of the United Kingdom
Ships built on the River Clyde
Merchant ships of the United Kingdom
Maritime incidents in January 1862